Uryv-Pokrovka is a rural locality (a selo) and the administrative center of Uryvskoye Rural Settlement, Ostrogozhsky District, Voronezh Oblast, Russia. The population was 1,647 as of 2010. There are 13 streets.

Geography 
Uryv-Pokrovka is located 46 km north of Ostrogozhsk (the district's administrative centre) by road. Devitsa is the nearest rural locality.

References 

Rural localities in Ostrogozhsky District